Sletteøya is an island between Tiholmane and Schareholmane in Thousand Islands, an archipelago south of Edgeøya, Svalbard, Norway.

References

 Norwegian Polar Institute Place Names of Svalbard Database

Islands of Svalbard